Cooperstown, New York is a village in and county seat of Otsego County, New York, United States.

Cooperstown may also refer to:

Places

Bahamas 
 Coopers Town, Abaco, Bahamas

United States 
 Cooperstown, Illinois
 Cooperstown, New Jersey
 Cooperstown, North Dakota
 Cooperstown, Pennsylvania
 Cooperstown, Wisconsin, a town
 Cooperstown (community), Wisconsin, an unincorporated community
 Cooperstown Township, Brown County, Illinois

Other uses
 USS Cooperstown, a United States Navy ship
 Cooperstown (film), a 1993 American drama film

See also
 Cooperstown Cocktail (cocktail), an alcoholic drink
 Cooperstown cocktail, a combination of pharmacological drugs
 Cooperton, Oklahoma 
 Coopertown (disambiguation)
 National Baseball Hall of Fame and Museum, which is in Cooperstown, New York and the word is often used as a shorthand or metonym